Howard William Rubie (27 August 1938 – July 2011) was an Australian director. Born in Sydney, he worked extensively in film and television, and was awarded for his services an Emmy and was nominated for an AFI Award (now known as the AACTA Award). and started his career in cinematography and was inducted in 2010 to the Australian Cinematographers Society Hall of Fame.

Select Credits
The World of the Seekers (1968) (documentary)
Woobinda, Animal Doctor (1969) (TV series) - various episodes
The Rovers (1969) (TV series) - various episodes
Barrier Reef (1971) (TV series) - various episodes
Wake in Fright (1971) (assistant director)
 Spyforce (1971–72) (TV series - various episodes)
Boney (1972) (TV series) - various episodes
Silent Number (1974) (TV series) - various episodes
Human Target (1974) (TV)
Shannon's Mob (1975) (TV series) - various episodes
The Lost Islands (1976) (TV series) - various episodes
The Haunting of Hewie Dowker (1976) (TV)
Chopper Squad (1978) (TV series) - various episodes
The Scalp Merchant (1978) (TV)
Secret Valley (1980-82) (TV series) - various episodes (also co creator)
Island Trader (1982) (TV)
Silent Reach (1983) (TV)
Chase Through the Night (1983) (TV)
The Settlement (1984)
Runaway Island (1984) (TV series) - various episodes
Stock Squad (1985) (TV)
Special Squad (1985-86) (TV series) - various episodes
Butterfly Island (1985-86) (TV series) - various episodes
Mission Top Secret (1992-95) (TV) - various episodes
The Phantom Horseman (1990) (TV)
Search for Treasure Island (1998-2000) (TV series) - various episodes
Escape of the Artful Dodger (2001) (TV series) - various episodes

References

External links

Obituary at TV Tonight
Obituary by Bob Ellis at Bob Ellis Table Talk
Howard Rubie at AustLit

1938 births
2011 deaths
Australian directors